The Cal State Northridge Matadors baseball team represents California State University, Northridge in the sport of baseball.

History
The program was established in 1959, and competed at the Division II level until 1990. The Matadors were associate members of the Western Athletic Conference (WAC) from 1993 through 1996, and joined the Big West in 2002 after five seasons as an independent.

While in Division II, Cal State Northridge claimed a pair of national championships  two runner-ups  and several other College World Series appearances.  Division I level, the Matadors have appeared in five NCAA Tournaments.

Notable players
Lyman Bostock (1971–1972)
Jason Thompson (1973–1975)
Adam Kennedy (second baseman, born 1976) 2002 ALCS MVP with the Anaheim Angels (1995-1997)
Jeff McNeil (utility player, born 1992) New York Mets (2013-present)

See also

List of NCAA Division I baseball programs

References

 
1959 establishments in California
Baseball teams established in 1959